Pine Street Pond is a  pond in Duxbury, Massachusetts. The pond is located southeast of Lower Chandler Pond and northeast of Reeds Millpond. The water quality is impaired due to non-native aquatic plants in the pond. The pond is hydrologically associated with a cranberry bog operation located to the west of the pond. An unnamed brook heading west through the cranberry bog and ultimately leading to Pine Brook is the outflow of the pond.

External links
Environmental Protection Agency
South Shore Coastal Watersheds - Lake Assessments

Ponds of Plymouth County, Massachusetts
Duxbury, Massachusetts
Ponds of Massachusetts